The Mencius (Old Chinese: *mˤraŋ-s tsəʔ) is a collection of conversations, anecdotes, and series of genuine and imagined interviews by the Confucian philosopher Mencius. The book is one of the Chinese Thirteen Classics, and explores Mencius' views on the topics of moral and political philosophy, often as a dialogue with the ideas presented by Confucianism. The interviews and conversations are depicted as being either between Mencius and the various rulers of the Warring States period, or with his students and other contemporaries. The book documents Mencius' travel across the states, and his philosophical conversations and debates with those he meets on his journey. A number of scholars suggest that the text was not written by Mencius himself, but rather by his disciples. The text is believed to have been written during the late 4th century BC.

History
Mencius' core ideas on education and human nature were largely shaped during the Warring States period (c. 770–221 B.C.).  the period when wars were being fought when the Zhou dynasty ended by the Qin in the middle of this Mencius and other scholars went to the different kingdoms and advised the rulers and people like in the jixia academy It was during this time, that Mencius was able to access, and further developed the philosophical doctrines of Confucius. The creation of the Mencius, serves as a further elaboration on the Confucian school of thought called 'subjective idealism'. Through this work, Mencius developed the theory of natural goodness (xingshan), that confers that all people have an intrinsic cardinal virtues, and that these virtues are developed in the same way that knowledge is cultivated.

The Mencius came to be regarded as one of the most important texts that explores the philosophy of Confucianism. Mainly, due to its philosophical dialogue with the Analects of Confucius. Despite this noted importance, the Mencius was not canonized as one of the Chinese Classics until over 1,000 years later during the Song-dynasty.

Interpretations 
Various interpretations exist of the Mencius as a philosophical and literary text. Academics E. Bruce and A. Taeko Brooks state that these various interpretations belong to a continuous discourse that represents each new generation of readers. Examples are scholars such as James Legge, who opened the text to Western readers by comparatively exploring the Mencius through a Victorian missionary perspective. The text's ability to transcend culture and time is seen by scholars such as Behuniak Jr. as what canonises the Mencius as a world classic.

Contents
There are seven chapters within the Mencius, each divided into two halves. The book's narrative depicts its characters' extensive dialogues on specific philosophical arguments, alongside Mencius's own reflections upon them in the form of short sentences. Most of the chapters that explores Mencius' moral philosophy, are structured in the form of a conversation between Mencius and other philosophical thinkers. While chapters that offer Mencius' political advice and counsel are depicted as conversations with various rulers and himself.

The book explores Mencius' most famous idea, in that there exists an intrinsic human nature that is good. His argument that each person possessed an inborn potential of virtue, contrasts with the position of contemporary figure Yang Zhu, who argued that that human nature is motivated by self-interest. Alongside this, the Mencius largely expands on Confucian ideas of political ruling, and benevolent politics.

Moral Philosophy 
In the Mencius, debates about morality and human nature are in direct dialogue with Confucian views. The theory of 'natural goodness', where human beings are inherently good, are explored through a concept of "sprouts". According to Mencius, "sprouts" are unlearned moral habits that are inborn and present at a person's birth. These moral habits are related to one's "family affection", and like "sprouts", grow out within the environment of familial activities. 

There exists four virtues of morality that makes up one's "sprouts":

 "humanity"
 "appropriateness"
 "ritual propriety"
 "wisdom" 

The four sprouts are what distinguish humans from other beings. However, there exists a distinction in that they are not what constructs humanity, but rather, something innate in which all humans already have. The Mencius states that these virtues develop in the acculturation of one's environment, "just as we have four limbs" (Mencius 2A:6). This environment being family affection, where the "four sprouts" activates amongst other unmonitored impulses.

Mencius also thinks that there exists a common human nature that causes people to respond the same way to certain ethical situations. One of the most famous arguments for this is presented within the Mencius in the chapter 1A:6, where Mencius successfully predicts an observer's immediate reaction to seeing a child about to fall into a well. Mencius argues that all people have a biological or inborn compassion, and goes further to imply that this inborn compassion is also a universal duty. Mencius refers to the idea of a biological sense of compassion as a form of duty in:"our sense of duty pleases the heart just as meat pleases the tastebuds." (Mencius 4A:2)In other words, in doing compassionate things, we not only please ourselves biologically but also dutifully.

Political Philosophy 
The Mencius expands on the Confucian claims about the necessary practices of a good ruler. This consists of "virtue politics" (de zheng 德政), "benevolent politics" (ren zheng 仁政), or "politics that is sensitive to the suffering of others" (bùrěn rén zhī zhèng 不忍人之政). These terms refers to the ideal way of governing politically, which is that a society must have policies that extends benevolently. These consists of fairness in goods distribution, and mainly policies that protect the most marginal societal members. Confucius, and in extension, Mencius contends that a good ruler must gain the devotion of the people through the exertion of benevolence and goodness. Mencius asserts Confucian ethics as the basis to achieving an ideal state.

Within the Mencius, this is expressed in his encounter with King Xuan of Qi, who rules over the Central Kingdom without practicing "benevolent politics". In this chapter, Mencius refers to the King's action as:"looking for fish by climbing a tree." (yuán mù qiú yú 緣木求魚) (Mencius 2A:4)Other passages within the Mencius addresses benevolent politics more directly:"An Emperor cannot keep the Empire within the Four Seas unless he is benevolent; a feudal lord cannot preserve the altars to the gods of earth and grain unless he is benevolent; a Minister or a Counsellor cannot preserve his ancestral temple unless he is benevolent; a junzi or a commoner cannot preserve his four limbs unless he is benevolent. Now if one dislikes death yet revels in cruelty, he is just like someone who drinks alcohol beyond his capacity while he dislikes drunkenness." (Mencius 4A:3)Mencius also counsels against the political use of violence and force:"When one uses force to win people's allegiance (yǐ lǐ fú rén 以理服人), one does not win people's hearts and minds (xīn fú 心服); they submit to your force because they are not strong enough." (Mencius 4A: 7)

Influences on Hermeneutics 
Asides from its influences on Neo-Confucianism. The Mencius has also had an effect on the field of literary discourse in China. Mainly, in the advancement of Chinese literary criticism into a direction that resembles the methods of Western intentionalist hermeneutics. These intentionalist concepts of interpretation (termed Mencian literary criticism), are seen as having dominated the methodology of literary criticism and interpretation in China ever since.

The Western intentionalist position traditionally judges the meaning of a literary work by the intentions of the author at the moment of its conception. Jane Gearney notes, that there exist various passages within The Mencius that propose a theory of literary interpretation that resembles this tradition. An example being:". . . one who explains poetry should not let the form obstruct the phrases or let the phrases obstruct the drift. One should meet the drift with one's own thoughts—that's how to obtain it." (Mencius 5A:4)In her evaluation of this passage, Gearney notes that the "drift" being referred to here can be understood as the author's intention. In this passage, Mencius poses that when it comes to evaluating a text, its form or structure should not come before the individual phrases. While the individual phrases should not obstruct the authorial intention (the drift) of the work, where the intention is met with the reader's own thoughts to form meaning. Mencius also encourages a friendship-based approach to literary criticism:  "The good scholars of a village befriend other good scholars of the village. The good scholars of the world befriend other good scholars of the world. If befriending the good scholars in the world isn't enough, they also proceed to consider the ancients. But how can they recite their poetry and read their books without knowing what kind of people they are? Therefore, they consider their age. This is "proceeding to befriend" [the ancients]." (Mencius 5B:8)The idea of knowing authors as people, is seen by Gearney as Mencius' suggestion for the reader to attempt to learn, as best they can, the author's intention when they were creating the text. Mencius emphasises knowing the author as a person, to suggest the importance of the setting and temporal context of a literary work in one's evaluation of it.

Though Mencian literary criticism is seen as having fostered intentionalist hermeneutics in China. Gearney notes that the form of intentionalism within the book differs from the style of traditional Western intentionalist modes of criticism. This difference is mainly to do with Mencius' emphasis on learning the author's contextual settings during the conception of the work, instead of the author's own feelings during its conception. Hence, the standard by which a work should be analysed does not involve the sentiments of the author at the exact moment of conception (as characterised by E.D Hirsh). But rather, Mencius' standards posits that one should become acquainted with the author's personal, cultural, and political context, before evaluating the literary work.

Selected translations

References

Footnotes

Works cited

External links 

The Works of Mencius: Legge's English translation
Mengzi Chinese text with Legge's English translation
Mencius (Selections), translated by A. Charles Muller
Mencius 《孟子》 Chinese and English text with matching English vocabulary at Chinese Notes

Chinese classic texts
Confucian texts
Humanism
Humanist literature
Zhou dynasty texts
4th-century BC books
Four Books and Five Classics
Thirteen Classics